Leptocroca asphaltis is a moth of the family Oecophoridae. It was described by Edward Meyrick in 1911. It is endemic to New Zealand.

Gallery

References

Moths described in 1911
Oecophoridae
Endemic fauna of New Zealand
Moths of New Zealand
Taxa named by Edward Meyrick
Endemic moths of New Zealand